Simpsonite has a general formula of .  It occurs as euhedral to subhedral tabular to short and prismatic crystals, commonly in subparallel groups. Under the petrographic microscope it has a very high relief. 

Discovered in 1938, it was named after Edward Sydney Simpson (1875–1939), government mineralogist and analyst of Western Australia. It is an accessory mineral in some tantalum-rich granite pegmatites. It occurs in association with tantalite, manganotantalite, microlite, tapiolite, beryl, spodumene, montebrasite, pollucite, petalite, eucryptite, tourmaline, muscovite and quartz. It is found in a few locations around the world, notably in the Onca and Paraiba mines of Rio Grande do Norte, Brazil and at Tabba Tabba, Western Australia.

References 

Aluminium minerals
Oxide minerals
Tantalum minerals
Niobium minerals
Trigonal minerals
Minerals in space group 143
Minerals described in 1938